Galala University (Arabic: جامعة الجلالة) is a national, non-profit Egyptian university located in Al Galala in Suez. The university includes 13 faculties in different fields of study. It was established by presidential decree in August 2020.

Location 
Galala University is located in the city of Galala Plateau in the Governorate of Suez on the coast of the Red Sea, on the El Galala Maritime Plateau, which is 700 meters above sea level between Ain Sokhna and Zaafarana.

Project 
The Armed Forces Engineering Authority, about 100 Egyptian national companies, and 150,000 workers, employees and engineers participated in the Galala Plateau project. Galala University was one of the project's goals on 173.5 feddans

Studying System 
The study at the university is based on the credit hour system that allows students to choose the courses they register to study in each semester, under academic guidance that tracks the student’s progress and ability to continue their studies.

In May 2021, GU signed an agreement with Arizona State University which aims to grant GU graduates dual degrees in the future in the fields of Engineering, Social & Human Sciences, Basic Sciences, Administrative Sciences, Media Production, and Art & Design, in addition to granting an accredited certificate from GU with administrative assistance from the commercial partner of Arizona State University (CINTANA) for the Fields of Pharmacy. Physical therapy, Nursing, and Food Industries.

Faculties and Centers 
Galala University contains 13 faculties, and offers 66 programs in fields of study ranging from medicine, science, engineering, media and communication, in addition to a college for graduate studies and 4 research and technology centers in addition to the Higher Academy of Sciences, a university hospital, and housing for students and professors. The university will accommodate 12,750 students in its three stages.

Faculties:

 Faculty of social and human science
 Faculty of administrative science
 Faculty of Mass media and Communication
 Faculty of Arts
 Faculty of Engineering
 Faculty of Computer science
 Faculty of Architecture
 Faculty of Food and Food industries
 Faculty of Medicine
 Faculty of dentistry
 Faculty of Physical Therapy
 Faculty of Pharmacy (pharma D Program)

Faculty of Engineering
Construction Engineering & Specialized Construction Program.
Architecture Engineering:
Architectural Design & Digital Architecture Program.
Environmental Architecture & Building Technology Program.
Mechanical Engineering:
Mechatronics & Industrial Automation Engineering Program.
Material & Manufacturing Engineering Program.
Electrical Engineering:
Power Engineering.
Computer Engineering Program.
Artificial Intelligence Engineering Program.

References 

Universities in Egypt
Research institutes in Egypt
Science and technology in Egypt
Al Galala
2020s establishments in Egypt